Antonio Cogorno O.P. (died 1565) was a Roman Catholic prelate who served as Bishop of Brugnato (1548–1565).

Biography
Antonio Cogorno was ordained a priest in the Order of Preachers. On 5 March 1548, he was appointed during the papacy of Pope Paul III as Bishop of Brugnato. He served as Bishop of Brugnato until his death in 1565. While bishop, he was the principal co-consecrator of Bartolomeo Ferro, Bishop of Lettere-Gragnano (1567).

References

External links and additional sources
 (for Chronology of Bishops) 
 (for Chronology of Bishops) 

16th-century Italian Roman Catholic bishops
Bishops appointed by Pope Paul III
1565 deaths
Dominican bishops